The 2013 French F4 Championship season was the 21st season of the series for 1600cc Formula Renault machinery, and the third season to run under the guise of the French F4 Championship. The series began on 27 April at Le Mans and ended on 27 October at Le Castellet, after seven rounds and twenty-one races.

Driver lineup

Race calendar and results

Championship standings
 Points are awarded to the top ten drivers in both races on a 25–18–15–12–10–8–6–4–2–1 basis. Additional points are awarded to the driver achieving pole position and fastest lap in each race. Only a driver's best twelve results count towards the championship.

† — Drivers did not finish the race, but were classified as they completed over 75% of the race distance.

References

External links
 The official website of the French F4 Championship 

F4 Championship
French F4